Alvand Hamedan F.C. (Former name Pas Novin Hamedan F.C.) is an Iranian football club based in Hamedan, Iran. They currently compete in the 2013–14 Azadegan League. After getting promoted to the Azadegan League, the team changed its name to Alvand Hamedan. In 2014 Alvand were relegated to the 2nd Division, after finishing 12th in the Azadegan League Group A.

History
Alvand Hamedan Sports Club was founded in 1970, but after a few years the club disappeared. In 2000 Shahrdari Hamedan Athletic and Cultural Club was established and was one of the leaders in the growth of football in Hamedan. After 10 years the club was dissolved and its licence in the 2nd Division was sold to Pas Novin, the reserve team of Pas Hamedan. After the team's name was changed to Alvand Hamedan, the team was allowed to participate in the Azadegan League. In 2014 Alvand was relegated back to the 2nd Division.

Season-by-season
The table below shows the achievements of the club in various competitions.

Players

See also
 2012–13 Azadegan League
 2011–12 Iran Football's 2nd Division

References

External links
  Official club website

Football clubs in Iran
Association football clubs established in 2008
2008 establishments in Iran